Merchants and Miners Transportation Company, often called M&M and Queen of Sea, was a major cargo and passenger shipping company founded in 1852 in Baltimore, Maryland. In 1852 is started with routes from Baltimore and Boston two wooden side wheelers ships. In 1859 M&M added two iron hulled steamers to its fleet. In 1866, post Civil War, M&M added routes to Providence, Rhode Island, Norfolk and Savannah, Georgia. In 1876 M&M purchased the Baltimore & Savannah Steamship Company add routes to Savannah, Jacksonville and Charleston. In 1907 the Winsor Line of Philadelphia's J. S. Winslow & Company of  Portland, Maine was purchased,  with seven steamships. The Winsor Line was founded in 1884 by J. S. Winslow. The Winsor Line first route was from Norfolk, Virginia to New England ports, supplying  West Virginia coal. The Winsor Line sailing ship Addie M. Lawrence took ammunition to Europe during World War I. By World War II M&M had a fleet of 18 ships and add routes to Miami.  With the outbreak of World War II the War Shipping Administration requisitioned Merchants and Miners Transportation Company fleet of ships for the war effort. 

During World War II Merchants and Miners Transportation Company operated Merchant navy ships for the United States Shipping Board. During World War II Merchants and Miners Transportation Company was active with charter shipping with the Maritime Commission and War Shipping Administration. Merchants and Miners Transportation Company operated Liberty ships for the merchant navy. The ship was run by its Merchants and Miners Transportation Company crew and the US Navy supplied United States Navy Armed Guards to man the deck guns and radio.

Post World War II, with an aging fleet of ships, the shareholders sold off the fleet of ships, did not buy any surplus warships and closed in 1948.

Jacob S. Winslow
Captain Jacob S. Winslow (1827-1902) founded the sailing ship company Winsor Line in 1861, he was born in Pembroke, Maine. He started as a seaman at age 14 and at 19 was the captain of his own ship.  He had two shipyards that built over 100 ships, one in Portland, the Winslow Shipbuilding Company and one in  Pembroke, Yarmouth County, Nova Scotia, Canada. In 1919 Captain W.A. Magee joined Winslow Shipbuilding Company as VP and GM.  Winslow was an abolitionist and politically active, he had the nickname of "barefoot". Winslow married Philena Morton (1832-1877) in 1853.

Ships
 Merchants and Miners Transportation Company ships:
 SS William Lawrence  (1869) a historic shipwreck and archaeological site off Hilton Head Island, South Carolina 
 SS Dorchester
 SS Yorktown (1894)
 USS Vulcan (1884) 
 SS Telena
 SS Suwannee, sold in 1917 to Savannah Line, renamed City of Rome. Sank 25 September 1925 after a collision with USS S-51 (SS-162). 

World War II ships:
 Victory ship:
 Pachaug Victory

Liberty ships:
 Harry L. Glucksman
 Dudley H. Thomas
 M. E. Comerford
 Mack Bruton Bryan  
 Milan R. Stefanik
 B. Charney Vladeck
 Nathaniel Alexander
 SS Lewis Emery Jr.
 Will Rogers
 William Few
 Albert C. Ritchie
 Amelia Earhart
 Edward A. Savoy
 Dolly Madison
 SS Thomas T. Tucker, sank 1942

All ships owned
All ship owned by Merchants and Miners Transportation Company:

See also 

 World War II United States Merchant Navy

References

External links 
 Liberty Ships built by the United States Maritime Commission in World War II

Transport companies established in 1852
Defunct shipping companies of the United States
1948 disestablishments in the United States
Transport companies disestablished in 1948